Pyrops pythicus is a species of true bug in the family Fulgoridae, in the genus Pyrops which are sometimes called lanternflies.

Subspecies
 Pyrops pythicus incertus Schmidt, 1923
 Pyrops pythicus pythicus (Distant, 1891)

Description
These large true bugs show an elongated bluish "snout". The hindwings are bluish green, with a large transversal reddish area and small white spots.

Distribution
This species can be found in Sumatra.

References

External links
 Image on Flickr

pythicus
Fauna of Sumatra
Insects described in 1891